Kim Myung-sung (Hangul: 김명성) (born April 8, 1988) is a South Korean pitcher. He bats and throws right-handed. Kim was selected fifth overall by the Lotte Giants in the 2011 KBO Draft.

Amateur career 
Kim was born in Seoul, and completed his mediocre high school career at Jangchung High School in Seoul, where his main position was an infielder. Kim went undrafted in the 2007 KBO Draft, and enrolled at Chung-Ang University to continue his baseball career.

Kim broke out in the  season with a 5–2 record and a 2.71 ERA, appearing in 16 games as a starting pitcher. In July, he was called up to the South Korean national baseball team for the 2009 Asian Baseball Championship held in Sapporo, Japan. In the championship, Kim made only one appearance for the team, tossing 0.1 innings of relief against Team Japan.

In July 2010, Kim was called up to play for Korea in the Korea-USA Baseball Championship Series. He started in Game 2 of the series and hurled 5.1 innings of two-run ball with 5 strikeouts against Team USA. On September 6, Kim was selected as the only amateur player of the final 24 members for the 2010 Asian Games in Guangzhou, China. Kim tossed 2.1 shutout innings in South Korea's 17-0 win over Pakistan in the group round of the baseball tournament at the Asian Games, allowing only one hit and racking up three strikeouts.

Notable international careers

References

External links 
 Korea Baseball Organization career statistics at Koreabaseball.com 

Lotte Giants players
Doosan Bears players
South Korean baseball players
Baseball players from Seoul
1988 births
Living people
Asian Games medalists in baseball
Baseball players at the 2010 Asian Games
Asian Games gold medalists for South Korea
Medalists at the 2010 Asian Games